Joseph Hendry (1886–1966) was a Scottish footballer who played as a left half. He featured for Rangers, Morton and Third Lanark amongst other clubs during his career.

Football career
Hendry began playing football with Maryhill. He joined Greenock Morton in December 1907 and stayed there until signing for Rangers in April 1910. Hendry made his debut in a 1–0 win at home against Clyde at the end of that month, and during his eight-year spell with the Gers, made 172 appearances and scored 8 goals. He won three Scottish Football League titles in succession in the 1910–11, 1911–12 and 1912–13 seasons, adding winner's medals from the Glasgow Cup in the first two of those campaigns, but played less as World War I escalated, spending his final year registered at Ibrox on loan at Dumbarton.

After leaving Rangers he had spells with Third Lanark, St Johnstone (then playing outside the SFL) and at Northern Irish club Distillery.

Later career
After retiring in 1923, Hendry began a service to provide commentaries for blind fans which was probably the first such service in the country. In 2019, his 1911 league medal sold for £2,400 at auction.

References

External links
Details of Rangers career

1886 births
1966 deaths
Date of death unknown
Date of birth unknown
Scottish footballers
Footballers from Greenock
Maryhill F.C. players
St Johnstone F.C. players
Third Lanark A.C. players
Dumbarton F.C. players
Rangers F.C. players
Greenock Morton F.C. players
Lisburn Distillery F.C. players
NIFL Premiership players
Association football wing halves
Scottish Football League players
Scottish Football League representative players